Denver, the Last Dinosaur is an TV animated series produced by World Events Productions and . It was nationally syndicated throughout the United States in 1988 with reruns airing until 1990. In the show, a dinosaur hatches from a petrified egg in modern times, and is befriended by a group of teenagers. Episodes often focused on issues of conservation, ecology, and greed.

The show ran for two seasons, as the dinosaur boom that had followed the film The Land Before Time (1988) waned until Jurassic Park (1993), causing viewership to drop. The series received a recommendation from the National Education Association.

A CG-animated reboot, which originally went, under the name Denver and Cliff premiered on M6 on August 27, 2018. The new series was produced by Zagtoon.

Plot
The show revolves around the adventures of Denver, the eponymous last dinosaur, who was released from his egg by a group of California teens:  Jeremy, Mario, Shades, Wally, and Casey, along with tag-along younger sister, Heather. The kids taught Denver the finer points of skateboarding and other pastimes while protecting him from rock concert promoter Morton Fizzback who wanted to use the dinosaur to make money.

The series begins when Jeremy, while preparing for his Natural History test, and his friends visit the La Brea Tar Pits – a place in Los Angeles which contains a large collection of extinct animal and plant fossils - and go to the Museum there. At the museum, the friends encounter a gang of bullies. The friends escape the bullies by hiding behind a fence near the tar pits. Behind the fence they find a pit that contains a large prehistoric egg. As the friends are playing with the egg it suddenly cracks and a green friendly dinosaur emerges who, inexplicably, understands English. The kids name him Denver after they spot an advertisement for the city of Denver on a passing bus.

The children decide to keep Denver and to keep his existence a secret.  Denver is first hidden in a pool house at Wally's home. After Wally's sister discovers Denver they move Denver to the old school gym. After a while, Denver gets kidnapped by the manager Morton Fizzback, who puts Denver on a stage in front of an audience to become rich.

When the children confront Morton about his abduction, he becomes paranoid that someone might find out that Denver is a real dinosaur.  At the end, Denver is sold to a scientist named Professor Funt, who wants to examine and experiment on him, and use him to become famous. Eventually, Denver gets to return to the gang and rescue them from Nick and his thugs.

In addition to his natural skills and abilities, Denver can also, with the help of a piece from the shell of his egg, take the gang with him back to the time whence he came.

Characters

Main characters
Denver is the main protagonist of the show and a close friend of the gang. He is a green unknown species of Dinosaur, the last of his kind, who has proven to be a good and loyal friend. Denver first met Wally, Shades, Jeremy, and Mario when he hatched from his egg when the boys hid behind a fence in the tar pit from Nick and his friends. He surprisingly understands English. Denver got his name when the boys spotted an advertisement for the city of Denver on the side of a bus. He is a rock 'n roll music fan and likes to play electric guitar, ride skateboard and eat potato chips. Voiced by Pat Fraley.
Wally Adams – Boy who takes Denver in, Denver's closest friend. He cares for various animals – including Rocky (his pup), three cats, Ears (a rabbit), and a parrot. Voiced by Adam Carl.
Heather Adams – Wally's older, and sometimes annoying, sister. She has blonde hair in a ponytail. Voiced by Kath Soucie.
Jeremy Anderson – the most intelligent and mature guy among the gang. He acts cerebral and possesses extensive knowledge about a wide variety of subjects, including the origin and habits of dinosaurs. Voiced by Adam Carl.
Mario – A brown skin and hair teen with an enormous ego. Voiced by Cam Clarke.
Shades – A cool teen who always wears sunglasses (where his name is derived from). Voiced by Cam Clarke.
Casey – Youngest of the gang, she is a machinist and often help the other members with the technical problems. She is in love with Mario, more obvious in the first season. Voiced by Kath Soucie.

Minor characters
Rocky – Wally's pup.
Chet – Heather's boyfriend, voiced by Rob Paulsen.
Freddy Facknitts – A teenage genius who is also a fan of comic books, and has a strong, though somewhat comical, sense of justice. He was originally hired by Morton Fizzback to conduct an experiment on Denver's tar egg shell, but later helps out Denver and the gang, and provides technical support.

Villains
Morton Fizzback – Drawn and voiced as an obvious characterization of actor Rodney Dangerfield, Fizzback is an arrogant, treacherous and greedy rock concert promoter voiced by Brian Cummings.
Professor Funt – Evil scientist, sometimes works with Morton, voiced by Brian Cummings.
Nick – Leader of three other bullies, Curt, Scott, and Rod, who cause trouble for the boys, voiced by Rob Paulsen.

Merchandise and home media releases
Knott's Berry Farm offered a Denver promotional tie-in with its new Kingdom of the Dinosaurs attraction (which would later take its last rider in 2004), as did Ralston Cereals with its new brand Dinersaurs (which sold poorly and was discontinued by the end of 1988).

Various episodes of the series were released on VHS by Fries Home Video.

World Events Productions released two DVD volumes through their Voltron.com website.  The first volume included the hour-long pilot and the following eight episodes. The second volume includes 10 episodes. World Events Productions had the complete series on YouTube; it was removed on December 31, 2010, because of synchronizing problems, but as of February 2012, all but three episodes had been restored. On February 11, 2011, World Events Productions released the complete series on Hulu.

On September 16, 2014, World Events Productions (distributed by VCI Entertainment) released Denver, The Last Dinosaur – The Complete Series on DVD in Region 1 for the very first time.

Episodes

Season 1 (1988)

Season 2 (1988)

2018 reboot
In October 2015, Zagtoon confirmed it was in the pre-production phase on a CG-animated reboot of the series. Produced with Method Animation, the new show premiered on M6 in France on August 27, 2018. Distributor PGS Entertainment sold the series to over 30 markets worldwide. In North America, Yoopa began airing it in Canada starting June 2, 2019, with TiVi5 Monde in the United States following in April 2020. In Belgium, the series debuted on La Trois on September 4, 2019.

An English dubbed version began airing in New Zealand on TVNZ in March 2019. In South Africa, it debuted on eToonz on January 15, 2020. In the United States, it premiered on Primo TV on December 7, 2020.

References

External links
 Official website from World Events Productions 
 
 Denver, the Last Dinosaur at YouTube

1988 American television series debuts
1988 American television series endings
Animated television series about dinosaurs
1980s American animated television series
1980s American children's television series
First-run syndicated television programs in the United States
English-language television shows
American children's animated adventure television series
American children's animated fantasy television series
Living dinosaurs in fiction
Anthropomorphic dinosaurs